The 2022 State of the Nation Address was the first State of the Nation Address that was delivered by President Bongbong Marcos on July 25, 2022 at the Batasang Pambansa Complex.

Preparations
On May 31, 2022, Marcos met with several members of the Congress of the Philippines to discuss his upcoming first State of the Nation Address. The Presidential Security Group hosted an inter-agency meeting on July 11 to discuss the security preparations for the upcoming SONA. SONA attendees were required to undergo a RT-PCR and a rapid antigen test. Other health precautions were also implemented, including the mandatory wearing of face masks and face shields for those entering the session hall. 21,853 security personnel were deployed to the Batasang Pambansa. The Philippine National Police imposed a gun ban in Metro Manila from July 22 to 27.

Seating and guests
On July 4, 2022, House of Representatives Secretary-General Mark Llandro Mendoza announced that it was expected that 315 members and 24 senators would attend the event, a total of 339 people. Mendoza also announced that the number of media to be allowed into the Batasang Pambansa would be limited. Former presidents Joseph Estrada and Gloria Macapagal Arroyo confirmed attendance to the SONA, however Arroyo tested positive for COVID. She instead attended the SONA online. Vice President Sara Duterte attended the event in person.

Address content and delivery

President Bongbong Marcos reported on the outcome of programs and policies that were promulgated under his predecessor, Rodrigo Duterte.

Before he started his speech, the singing of Lupang Hinirang, the national anthem which was led by the Samiweng Singers, the world-renowned choral group of his home province, Ilocos Norte. It was followed by the ecumenical prayer led to the audience by the representatives of various religious groups. Marcos started his speech at 4:05pm and ended at 5:19pm. He was joined by Senate President Juan Miguel Zubiri and his first cousin, House Speaker Martin Romualdez.

References

2022 in the Philippines
July 2022 events in the Philippines
2022 speeches
State of the Nation Addresses (Philippines)
Impact of the COVID-19 pandemic on politics
Presidency of Bongbong Marcos
Speeches by Bongbong Marcos